Vanja Yorgason Watkins (born 1938) is a prolific writer of hymns of the Church of Jesus Christ of Latter-day Saints (LDS Church). She composed the music for "Press Forward Saints" and "Families Can Be Together Forever", hymns that appear in the 1985 English-language hymnal of the LDS Church. She also wrote the music to a number of songs in the Primary's Children's Songbook, including the 13 "Articles of Faith" songs.

Watkins holds a bachelor's and master's degree from Brigham Young University (BYU). She has served on the general board of the Primary, the church's General Music Committee, and has been a stake Primary president and a stake Relief Society president. She taught music in public schools in Ogden and Salt Lake City and later at BYU.

Watkins married Jack B. Watkins, with whom she had five children.

Watkins contributed 27 works to the Children's Songbook.

Sources
Mormon Artist bio
churchofjesuschrist.org music listing for Watkins
Mormon Literature database listing for Watkins
Deseret News article on Watkins
Patricia Kelsey Graham. We Shall Make Music, p. 123

1938 births
American Latter Day Saint hymnwriters
Brigham Young University alumni
Brigham Young University faculty
Living people
American leaders of the Church of Jesus Christ of Latter-day Saints
Primary (LDS Church) people
Schoolteachers from Utah
American women educators
American women hymnwriters
Latter Day Saints from Utah
American women non-fiction writers
Date of birth missing (living people)